Arati Bhattacharya is an Indian Bengali actress, writer and director who is recognized for her work in Bengali cinema. Her on-screen pairings with actors such as Uttam Kumar, Soumitra Chatterjee, and Anil Chatterjee were popular. She later migrated to hindi and then to Bhojpuri film industry as a successful script writer.

Early life and education
Arati Bhattacharya was born in Jamshedpur, India. After passing in matriculation from D.M. Madan Girls High School she joined Jamsedpur Women's College but could not complete her studies.

Struggling days
After her first accidental meeting with Satya Bandhyopadhyay in a college drama in Jamsedpur Satya Bandhyopadhyay invited her to came and work in Kolkata as a Theater artist. Then she to Kolkata with her mother and started her acting career as a theater artist in "Nahabat" play in Rangmahal theater as lead role ' Keya '  Written and directed by Satya Bandhyopadhyay. After getting a break as a lead actress in the film “ Ek Adhuri Kahani ” directed by Mrinal Sen in 1972 she portrayed a number of memorable roles in the 1970s

Career
She is known for films like Preyasi, Stree, and Suryatrishna. She also gives her voice as a singer in the movie Anandamela in 1976. She had worked with Satyajit Roy in Jana Aranya and Mrinal Sen in Ek Adhuri Kahani. She acted in more than 50 Bengali movies. She is also a Kathak dancer. She is also directed a few hindi and Bhojpuri films. Now she is working as a successful script writer in Bhojpuri film industry.

Personal life
She married Bhojpuri actor and politician Kunal Singh. Actor Akash Singh is their son.

Awards
 Won, Bengal Film Journalists' Association – Best Supporting Actress Award  for Ami Se O Sakha  (1976)

Filmography

As an actor

As a director

As a script writer

References

External links
 

Indian film actresses
Actresses in Hindi cinema
Actresses in Bengali cinema
20th-century Indian actresses
Living people
20th-century Bengalis
Bengali Hindus
Bengali theatre personalities
Indian stage actresses
Indian women screenwriters
Year of birth missing (living people)